A crown-cardinal was a cardinal protector of a Roman Catholic nation, nominated or funded by a Catholic monarch to serve as their representative within the College of Cardinals and, on occasion, to exercise the right claimed by some monarchs to veto a candidate for election to the papacy. More generally, the term may refer to any cardinal significant as a secular statesman or elevated at the request of a monarch.

Francis Burkle-Young defines a crown cardinal as one "elevated to the cardinalate solely on the recommendation of the European kings and in many cases without having performed any service at all for the advancement of the Church."

According to conclave historian Frederic Baumgartner, the crown-cardinals "rarely came to Rome except for the conclaves, if then, and they were largely unknown to the majority of the College. Usually unable to take part in the pratiche, they were not papabili and rarely received more than one or two votes". Crown-cardinals generally opposed the election of crown-cardinals from other kingdoms, although they tended to unite against the election of cardinal-nephews.

Opposition to national cardinal protectors arose in the fifteenth century due to the perceived conflict of interest, and Pope Martin V attempted to forbid them entirely in 1425. A reform of Pope Pius II dated 1464 regards national cardinal protectors as generally inconsistent with curial responsibility, with several exceptions. Such protectorships were first openly permitted by popes Innocent VIII and Alexander VI, both of whom required the explicit written consent of the pontiff for a cardinal to take up a "position of service to a secular prince". An unnamed cardinal even suggested elevating national cardinal protectors to a full and official position in the Roman Curia, equivalent to an ambassador.

History
The institution of a cardinal protector of a nation-state may have originated in the 14th century, serving as a predecessor for the diplomatic institutions of the Holy See developed in the 16th century. The institution of the crown-cardinal first became a dominant one within the College of Cardinals with the consistory of Pope Eugene IV on December 18, 1439 (on the heels of the election of Antipope Felix V by the Council of Basel), which nominated an unprecedented number of cardinals with strong ties to European monarchs and other political institutions.

The first explicit reference to protectorship pertaining to a nation-state dates to 1425 (the Catholic Encyclopedia says 1424) when Pope Martin V forbade cardinals to "assume the protection of any king, prince or commune ruled by a tyrant or any other secular person whatsoever." This prohibition was renewed in 1492 by Pope Alexander VI. This prohibition was not renewed by Pope Leo X in the ninth session of the Lateran Council of 1512.

Some crown-cardinals were cardinal-nephews or members of powerful families; others were selected solely on the recommendation of European monarchs, in many cases with little previous ecclesiastical experience. During the reigns of Avignon Pope Clement VI and Pope Urban VI in particular, it was acknowledged that monarchs could select retainers and expect them to be elevated to the College of Cardinals. The going rate for the creation of a crown-cardinal was about 2,832 scudi.

Pope Alexander VII had to elevate crown-cardinals in pectore. Pope Urban VI (1378–1389) forbade crown-cardinals from receiving gifts from their respective sovereigns.

World War I cemented the decline of the institution of the crown cardinal, as many monarchies either became extinct or declined in power.

Role in conclaves

In the case of Spain, France, and Austria, from the 16th to 20th centuries, crown-cardinals had the prerogative to exercise the jus exclusivae, that is, to veto a candidate for the papacy deemed "unacceptable" by their patron. Crown-cardinals usually arrived with a list of such candidates but often had to confer with their patrons during conclaves via messengers and attempt, with varying degrees of success, to delay the conclave from proceeding until they received a response. For example, Pope Innocent X (elected 1644) and Pope Innocent XIII (elected 1721) survived late-arriving veto instructions from France and Spain respectively. Austrian crown-cardinal Carlo Gaetano Gaisruck reached the papal conclave of 1846 too late to exercise the veto against Giovanni Maria Mastai-Ferretti, who had already been elected and taken the name Pius IX).

List of cardinal protector crown-cardinals
The following includes a complete list of crown cardinal-protectors in the sixteenth and seventeenth centuries:

Of Hungary
Pietro Isvalies (1507–1511)
Giulio de Medici (?– 1523)

Of Austria

Protectors:

1523–1531: Lorenzo Pucci
1532–1535: Giovanni Salviati
1540–1542: Girolamo Aleander
1542–1555: Marcello Cervini
1555–1580: Giovanni Girolamo Morone
1580–1600: Andreas von Österreich
1603–1634: Franz von Dietrichstein
1635–1638: Ippolito Aldobrandini
1638–1642: Maurizio di Savoia
1655–1667: Ernst Adalbert von Harrach
Federico Sforza (1664–1666, substitute protector of Habsburg hereditary lands)
1673–1689: Carlo Pio di Savoia
1689–1701: Francesco Maria de' Medici
1701–1707: Leopold Karl von Kollonitsch
1707–1712: Johann Philipp von Lamberg
1712–1725: Christian von Sachsen-Zeitz
1726–1738: Wolfgang von Schrattenbach
1738–1751: Sigismund von Kollonitsch
1751–1758: Ferdinand Julius von Troyer
1779–1800: František Herczan
1823–1834: Giuseppe Albani
1858–1867: Pietro Silvestri

Vice-protectors and co-protectors

1536–1541: Alessandro Cesarini
1560–1565: Cristoforo Madruzzo
1571: Marcantonio Colonna
1574/ 1580/81: Tolomeo Galli
1581–1603: Alfonso Gesualdo
1584–1587: Antonio Carafa
1604–1607: Alfonso Visconti
1607–1611: Ottavio Paravicini
1612–1621: Pietro Aldobrandini
1621–1632: Ludovico Ludovisi
1629–1631: Cosimo de Torres
1635–1641: Carlo Emanuele di Savoia
1642–1644: Alfonso de la Cueva
1644–1655: Ernst von Harrach
1645–1664: Girolamo Colonna
1664–1667: Fedrigo Sforza
1667–1675: Friedrich von Hessen-Darmstadt
1690–1693: José Saenz d'Aguirre
1694–1700: Francesco del Guidice
1701/02/ 1706–1710: Vincenzo Grimani
1703–05/ 1708–12: Fabrizio Paolucci
1713–1719: Wolfgang von Schrattenbach
1719–1722: Michael Friedrich von Althan
1722–1726: Alvaro Cienfuegos
1735–1743: Niccolò del Giudice
1743–1779: Alessandro Albani

Of England

Of Ireland
Girolamo Ghinucci (1539–1541)
Rodolfo Pio di Carpi (1545–1554)
Giovanni Girolamo Morone (1555? – 1574?)
Francesco Alciati (1574–1580)
Flavio Orsini (1580–1581)
Nicholas Pelleve (1582–1594)
Girolamo Mattei (1594? – 1603)
Pompeo Arrigoni (1605–1616)
Fabrizio Veralli (1616? – 1624)
Ludovico Ludovisi (1625–1632)
Antonio Barberini (1633? – 1671)
Paluzzo Paluzzi Altieri degli Albertoni (1671–1698)
Giuseppe Renato Imperiali (1706–1737)
Neri Maria Corsini (1737–1770)
Mario Marefoschi (1771–1780)
Gregorio Salviati (1781–1794)
Carlo Livizzani (1794–1802)

Of Scotland
Antoniotto Pallavicini (1504–1507)
Pietro Accolti (1514–1532)
Benedetto Accolti (1532–1538)
Rodolfo Pio di Carpi (1538–1549)
Giovanni Domenico de Cupis (1550–1553)
Niccolo Caetani Sermoneta (1570–1585)
Camillo Borghese (1603–1605)
Maffeo Barberini (1608–1623)
Francesco Barberini (1623–1679)
Phillip Howard of Norfolk (1680–1694)
Taddeo da Verme (1706–1717)
Alessandro Falconieri (1727–1734)
Domenico Riviera (1734–1752)
Giuseppe Spinelli (1754–1763)
Giovanni Francesco Albani (1763–1803)
Charles Erskine (1804–1811)

Of France

The King of France historically had only one cardinal protector at a time, chosen by a complicated process that involved the King, the secretary of state for foreign affairs, the French ambassador to Rome, and other French power brokers, but not the Pope. The crown-cardinal of France was also abbot in commendam of several French abbeys.

There was traditionally at least one resident French cardinal in the Roman Curia during the first half of the sixteenth century, but Louis XII and Francis I chose three successive Italian cardinals as protector of France thereafter.
1513–1516: Federico di Sanseverino
1516–1523: Giulio de Medici
1523–1548: Agostino Trivulzio
Niccolò Gaddi (vice-protector from 1533)
1549–1572: Ippolito II d'Este
1573–1586: Luigi d'Este
1587–1615: François de Joyeuse
Vice-protector Arnaud d'Ossat (1599–1604)
Vice-protector François de La Rochefoucald (October 1609–May 1611)
1616–1620: Alessandro Orsini
Guido Bentivoglio (vice-protector from 1621 until 1636)
1621–1636: Maurizio di Savoia
1636–1644: Antonio Barberini
1645–1672: Rinaldo d'Este
Alessandro Bichi (vice-protector 1645 until 1657)
1672–1676: Virginio Orsini (from 1646 acted as co-protector)
1676–1701: César d'Estrées
1702–1709: Francesco Maria de’Medici
1709–1740: Pietro Ottoboni
Pierre Guérin de Tencin, acting protector until 1758
1758–1765: Prospero Colonna di Sciarra
1769–1792/4: François-Joachim de Pierre de Bernis

Of the Holy Roman Empire

The protector of the Holy Roman Empire was often the protector of the Austrian hereditary lands.

1492–1503: Francesco Piccolomini
1518–1539: Lorenzo Campeggio
1540: Pedro Manriquez
1540–1542: Girolamo Aleander
1542–1550: Innocenzo Cibo
1550–1557: Juan Álvarez de Toledo
1557–1573: Otto Truchsess von Waldburg
1573–1600: Ludovico Madruzzo
1603–1611: Ottavio Paravicini
1611–1633: Scipione Borghese
1635/36: Franz von Dietrichstein
1636–1642: Moritz von Savoyen
1644–1666: Girolamo Colonna
1666–1682: Friedrich von Hessen-Darmstadt
1682–1689: Carlo Pio di Savoia
1689–1701: Francesco Maria de' Medici
1701–1707: Leopold von Kollonitsch
1707–1712: Johann Philipp von Lamberg
1712–1725: Christian August von Sachsen-Zeitz
1726–1738: Wolfgang von Schrattenbach
1738–1751: Sigismund von Kollonitsch
1751–1758: Ferdinand Julius von Troyer
1758–1765: vacant
1765–1779: Alessandro Albani
1779–1800: Franziskus von Paula Herzan von Harras

Vice-protectors and co-protectors
1517–1530: Lorenzo Pucci
1530–1532: Wilhelm van Enkevoirt
1534–1539: Alessandro Cesarini
1538–1540: Girolamo Ghinucci
1540–1542: Alessandro Farnese
1542–1550: Juan Álvarez de Toledo
1550–1553: Bernardo Maffei
1557–1559: Pedro Pacheco de Villena
1558–1568: Clemente Dolera
1587–1593: Filippo Spinola
1594–1600: Ottavio Paravicini
1621–1625: Eitel Friedrich von Hohenzollern
1625–1644: Giulio Savelli
1644: Girolamo Colonna
1664–1666: Federico Sforza (substitute protector)
1666–1682: Carlo Pio di Savoia
1690–1693: José Saenz d'Aguirre
1694–1700: Francesco del Guidice
1701/02/ 1706–1710: Vincenzo Grimani
1703–05/ 1708–12: Fabrizio Paolucci
1713–1719: Wolfgang von Schrattenbach
1719–1722: Michael Friedrich von Althan
1722–1726: Alvaro Cienfuegos
1735–1743: Niccolò del Giudice
1745–1765: Alessandro Albani

Of Poland
Pedro Isvalies (ca. 1506 — 1511)
Achille de Grassi (1512–1523)
Lorenzo Pucci (1523–1531)
Antonio Pucci (1532–1544)
Alessandro Farnese (1544–1589)
Bernardino Maffei (vice-protector 1550–1553)
Giacomo Puteo (vice-protector 1555–1563)
Giacomo Savelli (vice-protector 1563–1587)
Alessandro Peretti di Montalto (1589–1623)
Cosimo de Torres (vice-protector 1622–1623, protector 1623–1642)
Giulio Savelli (1642–1644)
Gianbattista Pamphilj (vice-protector until 1644)
Gaspare Mattei (1644–1650)
Virginio Orsini (co-protector 1647–1650, protector 1650–1676)
Pietro Vidoni (co-protector 1676, protector 1676–1681)
Carlo Barberini (1681–1704)
Annibale Albani (1712–1751)
Gian Francesco Albani (1751–1795)

Of Sweden
Cardinal-protectors of Sweden were appointed by king of Poland Zygmunt III Waza, who had claimed the rights to the Swedish Crown.
Odoardo Farnese (1601–1626)
Lorenzo Magalotti (1626–1637)

Of Portugal
1517–1531: Lorenzo Pucci
1533–1544: Antonio Pucci
1545–1564: Guido Ascanio Sforza
1565–1572: Carlo Borromeo
1573–1589: Alessandro Farnese
1591–1603: Alfonso Gesualdo
1604–1626: Odoardo Farnese
1626–1634: Francesco Barberini
1635–1638: Ippolito Aldobrandini
1657–1676: Virginio Orsini
1676–1714: César d'Estrées
1714–1721: Michelangelo Conti
1739–1770: Neri Maria Corsini
1859–1884: Camillo di Pietro
1887–1888: Włodzimierz Czacki
1891–1910/30: Vincenzo Vannutelli

Of Savoy/Kingdom of Sardinia
Protectors of the Duchy of Savoy
1534–1537: Paolo Cesi
1576–1594: Michele Bonelli
1594–1621: Pietro Aldobrandini
1621–1632: Ludovico Ludovisi
1633–1671: Antonio Barberini
1671–1704: Carlo Barberini

Protectors of the Kingdom of Sardinia
1727–1779: Alessandro Albani
1819? – 1834: Giuseppe Albani
1835–1853: Luigi Lambruschini

Of Naples
1530–1542: Alessandro Cesarini
1544–1549: Alessandro Farnese
1556–1564: Guido Ascanio Sforza
1566–1574: Alessandro Sforza
1574–1603: Alfonso Gesualdo
1605–1608: Ascanio Colonna
1608–1642: Girolamo Doria
1644–1650: Gaspare Mattei
1657–1663: Camillo Astalli
1664–1676: Federico Sforza
1689–1699: José Saenz d'Aguirre

Of Sicily
1524–1542: Alessandro Cesarini
1542–1589: Alessandro Farnese
1592–1626: Odoardo Farnese
1626–1634: Francesco Barberini
1635–1642: Luigi Caetani
1645–1656: Pier Donato Cesi
1664–1687: Lorenzo Raggi
Federico Sforza (1664–1666, substitute protector)
1687–1699: José Saenz d'Aguirre
1699–1725: Francesco del Giudice

Of the Kingdom of Two Sicilies
1738–1747: Troiano Acquaviva d'Aragona
1747–1789: Domenico Orsini
1789–1795: Ferdinando Spinelli
1799–1806?: Fabrizio Dionigi Ruffo

Of Castile/Spain

The King of Spain could have as many as five or six cardinal protectors simultaneously, although traditionally the protector of Castile was the most frequently turned to.
1516–1517: Francisco Remolins
1517–1529: Lorenzo Pucci
1529–1534: Andrea della Valle
1534–1563: Ercole Gonzaga
1563–1566: Francesco Gonzaga
1566–1574: Francisco Pacheco de Toledo
1574–1581: Alessandro Sforza
1582–1588: Ferdinando de' Medici
Francesco Alciati (Vice-protector circa 1569)
1588–1592: Juan Hurtado Mendoza
1592–1599: Pedro de Deza Manuel
1599–1601: Alessandro d'Este
1601–1606: Francisco de Ávila
1606–1617: Antonio Zapata y Cisneros
1617–1632: Gaspar de Borja y Velasco
1632–1645: Gil Carrillo de Albornoz
1645–1666: Carlo de' Medici
Federico Sforza (1664–1667, substitute protector)
1667–1672: Friedrich von Hessen-Darmstadt
1673–1677: Luis Manuel Fernández de Portocarrero
1677–1689: Carlo Pio di Savoia
1689–1702: Francesco Maria de' Medici
1702–1713?: Francesco del Giudice
1713–1725: Francesco Acquaviva d'Aragona
1725–1743: Luis Antonio Belluga y Moncada
1743–1747: Troiano Acquaviva d'Aragona
1748–1760: Joaquín Fernández de Portocarrero

Of Aragon
1517–1531: Lorenzo Pucci
1531–1542: Alessandro Cesarini
1542–1589: Alessandro Farnese
1592–1626: Odoardo Farnese
1626–1634: Francesco Barberini
1635–1641: Carlo Emanuele Pio di Savoia
1645–1666: Girolamo Colonna
1666–1682: Friedrich von Hessen-Darmstadt
1682–1689: Carlo Pio di Savoia
1689–1702: Francesco Maria de’Medici

Of Flanders
1561–1572: Carlo Borromeo
1573–1597: Marcantonio Colonna
1597–1608: Ascanio Colonna
1608–1633: Scipione Caffarelli-Borghese
1633–1642: Pietro Maria Borghese
1644–1666: Girolamo Colonna
Federico Sforza (1664–1666, substitute protector)
1669–1676: Friedrich von Hessen-Darmstadt
1677–1689: Carlo Pio di Savoia
1689–1702: Francesco Maria de' Medici

List of other national cardinal protectors

Of Switzerland
Carlo Borromeo (1560–1572)
Paolo Emilio Sfondrati (1591–1618)
Odoardo Farnese (1618–1626)
Francesco Barberini (1626–1679)
Carlo Barberini (1680–1704)
Fabrizio Spada (1712–1717)
Annibale Albani (1717–1751)

Of Republic of Genoa
Giandomenico Spinola (1626–1630)
Laudivio Zacchia (1631–1637)
Pietro Maria Borghese (1638–1642)

List of non-cardinal protector crown-cardinals

Of Austria
Andrew of Austria, son of Archduke Ferdinand
Joseph Dominicus von Lamberg (December 20, 1737 – August 30, 1761)
Rudolf of Austria (June 4, 1819 – July 24, 1831), Archbishop of Olomouc, Archduke
Carlo Gaetano Gaisruck (Papal conclave circa 1846)
Jan Maurycy Pawel Puzyna de Kosielsko (Papal conclave circa 1903)

Of Bavaria
Philipp Wilhelm (22 September 1576 – 18 May 1598), Bishop of Regensburg from 1595, Cardinal from 1597
Johann Casimir v. Häffelin (6 April 1818 – 27 August 1827), Ambassador of Bavaria to the Holy See (since 18 November 1803), probably a de facto court bishop since 11 November 1787 (as general vicar of the Bavarian Priory of the Order of Malta)

Of England
Charles of Guise, uncle of Mary, Queen of Scots

Of France

Jean Jouffroy, continued role as procurator after elevation as cardinal
Jean Balue, continued role as procurator after elevation as cardinal; styled as "French protector" in Rome
André d'Espinay (March 9, 1489 – November 10, 1500)
Armand Jean de Richelieu (November 3, 1622 – December 4, 1642), Bishop of Luçon, Prime Minister
Jules Mazarin (1641–1661)
Jean Siffrein Maury (1794–1806), Archbishop of Montefiascone, representative of the Bourbon pretender, sided with Napoleon I in 1806
Joseph Fesch (2 December 1804 – 22 June 1815), Archbishop of Lyons, step-uncle to Napoleon I, Ambassador of France to the Holy See (1803–1806, but in 1803 there wasn't as yet a crown) and Imperial Grand Almoner (1805–1814); his role as crown-cardinal ended with the end of the Napoleonic reign, whereas he remained Cardinal and Archbishop

Of the Holy Roman Empire
Albert of Austria, son of Maximilian II, Holy Roman Emperor

Of Poland
Jerzy Radziwiłł (1556–1600)
Jan Aleksander Lipski (December 20, 1737 – February 20, 1746)

Of Portugal
Cardinal-Infante Afonso of Portugal
Henry of Portugal
Tomás de Almeida (December 20, 1737 – February 27, 1754)

Of Spain
Pedro González de Mendoza (May 7, 1473 – January 11, 1495)
Francisco Jiménez de Cisneros
Cardinal-Infante Ferdinand
Luis Antonio Jaime de Borbón y Farnesio (December 19, 1735 – December 18, 1754)
Francisco de Solís Folch de Cardona (April 5, 1756 – March 21, 1775)

Of Tuscany
Ferdinando I de' Medici, Grand Duke of Tuscany

See also
Prince of the Church
Prince-Bishop
Lord Bishop
Cardinal-nephew
Lay cardinal

References

Sources
Baumgartner, Frederic J. 2003. Behind Locked Doors: A History of the Papal Elections. Palgrave Macmillan. .
Pastor, Ludwig. 1902. The History of Popes. K. Paul, Trench, Trübner & Co., Ltd.
Wilkie, William E. 1974. The cardinal protectors of England. Cambridge University Press.

Peter Tusor, "Prolegomena zur Frage des Kronkardinalats," Archivum Historiae Pontificiae Volume 41 (2003), pp. 51–71.

^
Lists of Roman Catholics
Election of the Pope
Cardinal protectors